is a train station on the Nankai Main Line in Suminoe-ku, Osaka, Osaka Prefecture, Japan, operated by the private railway operator Nankai Electric Railway.

Lines
Suminoe Station is served by the Nankai Main Line, and has the station number "NK09".

Layout
The station has two elevated island platforms serving two tracks each. Suminoe Depot is located in the west of the station.

Surrounding area
The district in the west of the station is "Suminoe" (住之江) and "Nishisuminoe" (西住之江).

Osaka City Bus
Buses are operated by Osaka Municipal Transportation Bureau.
Route 3 for Deto Bus Terminal via Harimacho / for Subway Suminoekoen
Route 25 (no operation on Sundays and holidays) for Sumiyoshi Shako-mae via Harimacho and Furitsu Sogo Iryo Center / for Subway Suminoekoen

Adjacent stations

See also
 List of railway stations in Japan

References

External links

  

Railway stations in Japan opened in 1907
Railway stations in Osaka Prefecture